Kuortaneen lukio ja urheilulukio or the Kuortane Lukio and Sports Academy is a general and sports-specialised  in Kuortane, Finland.

The sports academy is overseen by the Finnish Olympic Committee and affiliated with the Kuortane Olympic Training Centre, which is situated to the immediate northwest of and shares many facilities with the school. 

Olympic gold medalist in javelin, Tapio Korjus, previously served as head of the school.

References

Schools in Finland
Education in South Ostrobothnia
Urheilulukio
Sports schools in Finland